Robert Howard (7 January 1956 – 17 August 2013) was an Irish swimmer. He competed in two events at the 1976 Summer Olympics.

References

External links
 

1956 births
2013 deaths
Irish male swimmers
Olympic swimmers of Ireland
Swimmers at the 1976 Summer Olympics
Place of birth missing